Sir William Wrey, 1st Baronet (died 1636) of Trebeigh, St Ive, Cornwall and North Russell, Sourton, Devon, was High Sheriff of Cornwall in 1598 and was created a baronet by King Charles I in 1628.

Origins
He was the second son of John Wrey (d.1597) by his wife Blanch Killigrew (d.1595), heiress of Trebeigh, daughter and heiress of Henry Killigrew, Esquire, of Woolstone, in the parish of Poundstock, near St Ive, in Cornwall.

Inheritance
William succeeded his childless elder brother John II Wrey, who had married (as her 3rd husband) Eleanor Smith, daughter and heiress of Bernard Smith (c.1522-1591), Esquire, of Totnes in Devon, MP for Totnes in 1558 and mayor of  Totnes 1549-50 and c.1565-6 also was escheator of  Devon and Cornwall 1567-8.

Career
William was High Sheriff of Cornwall in 1598. and was knighted at Whitehall on 27 July 1603 before the Coronation of King James I. He played  a leading figure in the local government of Cornwall. He served as a Deputy Lieutenant and a Commissioner of Oyer and Terminer. He served in the honorary post of Recorder of Liskeard from about 1615 to his death. He was created a baronet by King Charles I in 1628. He was described by Carew (1602)  as a man of hospitality, and a general welcomer of his friends and neighbours.

Lands held
He added to his patrimony inherited from his brother, much of which formed his mother's Killigrew inheritance, and at his death  he owned over 6,000 acres including four manors in Cornwall and a share in four others.

Marriage and children

He married (as his 2nd wife)Elizabeth Courtenay, a daughter of Sir William V Courtenay (1553–1630) of Powderham in Devon (by his wife Elizabeth Manners, daughter of Henry Manners, 2nd Earl of Rutland (1526-1563)) by whom he had an only son  and heir:
Sir William Wrey, 2nd Baronet (1600-1645) who in about 1624  married Elizabeth Chichester, daughter of Edward Chichester, 1st Viscount Chichester (1568-1648) of Eggesford in Devon. He served as MP for Liskeard in 1624. The 2nd Baronet left an only son and heir Sir Chichester Wrey, 3rd Baronet (1628-1668) of Trebitch, MP for Lostwithiel.

See also
Wrey Baronets

Sources
Betham, William, Baronetage of England, Vol.1, 1771, pp.300-303, Wrey Baronets
Wotton, Thomas, Baronetage of England, 1771
Pole, Sir William (d.1635), Collections Towards a Description of the County of Devon, Sir John-William de la Pole (ed.), London, 1791
 Hunneyball, Paul, biography of  Wrey, William (c.1601-1645), of Trebigh, St. Ive, Cornwall, published in The History of Parliament: the House of Commons 1604-1629, ed. Andrew Thrush and John P. Ferris, 2010
Vivian, Lt.Col. J.L. & Drake, H.H., (Eds.) The Visitation of the County of Cornwall in the year 1620, Harleian Society, 1st series, Volume 9, London, 1874, p. 268, pedigree of Wrey
Vivian, Lt.Col. J.L., The Visitations of Cornwall: Comprising the Heralds' Visitations of 1530, 1573 & 1620; with Additions by J.L. Vivian, Exeter, 1887, pp.564-566, pedigree of "Wrey of Trebeigh"

References

1636 deaths
High Sheriffs of Cornwall
Year of birth unknown
Baronets in the Baronetage of England